Munyon may refer to:

 James M. Munyon (1848–1918), American promoter of homeopathy
 Munyon Island, Florida, named after James M. Munyon
 Munyon, California, an unincorporated community

See also 
 James LeMunyon (born 1959), American politician and entrepreneur